This article contains a list in alphabetical order of rugby league players who have played for Jamaica in full international matches since the team's first match in 2009.

A
 Mo Agoro
 Jordan Andrade

B

C
 Roy Calvert
 Nathan Campbell
 Romaen Campbell
 Omari Caro
 Mason Caton-Brown
 Jahden Clarke
 Jermaine Coleman
 Jy-Mel Coleman

D
 Andrew Dixon
 Ethon Dwyer

F
 Izaac Farrell
 Joel Farrell
 Andrew Fong

G
 Damon Gayle
 Ashton Golding
 Jamel Goodall
 Jason Gooden
 Jakeba Grant
 Ryan Grant
 Roland Grey

H

J
 Omar James
 Ashley Johnson
 Greg Johnson
 Omar Jones
 Orlando Jones
 Aaron Jones-Bishop
 Ben Jones-Bishop

L
 Michael Lawrence
 Owen Linton

M

N
 Dwain Nelson
 Kile Nembhard

O
 Jacob Ogden

P
 Andrew Pang
 Michael Pearson
 Ross Peltier
 Jermaine Pinnock
 Karl Pryce
 Steve Pryce
 Waine Pryce

R
 Andre Reid
 Wayne Reittie
 Everton Richards
 Reinhardo Richards
 Robert Rodney
 Tyronie Rowe

S
 Duain Scott
 Stephen Scott
 Joseph Shae
 Jode Sheriffe
 Andrew Simpson
 Orien Smith

T

W

Y
 Claude Yen

References

 
Jamaica